William Joseph Wivell (born June 9, 1964) is a Republican member of the Maryland House of Delegates. Since 2015, he has represented District 2A, which covers parts of Washington County.

Early life and career
Wivell was born in Hagerstown, Maryland on June 9, 1964. He attended Smithsburg High School in Smithsburg, Maryland and graduated from Hagerstown Community College with a A.A. degree in 1984. He later graduated from Shepherd University with a B.A. in 1986, and from Mount Saint Mary's University with an M.B.A.  in 1991. Wivell currently works as a business administrator at the St. James School.

In 1998, Wivell was elected to the Washington County Board of County Commissioners, where he served until he retired in 2010 to "take a break from public life to focus on other things". Wivell was re-elected to the Board of County Commissioners in 2014, where he served until Governor Larry Hogan appointed him to serve in the Maryland House of Delegates in February 2015, filling a vacancy left by the resignation of delegate Andrew A. Serafini to serve in the Maryland Senate.

Wivell is an endowment life member of the National Rifle Association.

In the legislature
Wivell was sworn into the Maryland House of Delegates on March 16, 2015.

In August 2020, following the resignation of senator Andrew Serafini, Wivell applied to fill the vacancy he left in the Maryland Senate. The Washington County Republican Central Committee and Governor Larry Hogan would end up nominating delegate Paul D. Corderman to fill the vacancy.

In October 2021, Wivell was one of five Maryland state legislators from Garrett, Allegany, and Washington counties who sent a pair of letters to West Virginia officials asking about annexation of Western Maryland to West Virginia. These letters caused a local uproar, with Allegany County officials calling the request a political stunt, an embarrassment and unneeded distraction. Following criticism from local officials and some constituents, Delegate Jason Buckel and State Senator George Edwards issued a letter withdrawing support for the secession proposal.

Committee assignments
 Environment and Transportation Committee, 2016–present (housing & real property subcommittee, 2016–present; local government & bi-county agencies subcommittee, 2016–present; land use & ethics subcommittee, 2020–present)
 Appropriations Committee, 2015–2016 (education & economic development subcommittee, 2016; oversight committee on pensions, 2016)

Other memberships
 Chair, Washington County Delegation, 2019–present

Electoral history

References

Republican Party members of the Maryland House of Delegates
Living people
1964 births
Politicians from Hagerstown, Maryland
21st-century American politicians
County commissioners in Maryland